Synthesis Live was a concert tour by American rock band Evanescence, in support of their fourth studio album, the orchestral and electronica-based Synthesis (2017). This was the first tour where the band performed with an orchestra on stage. For each city on the tour, a local orchestra was assembled by conductor Susie Seiter. Synthesis Live included 60 concerts in cities across North America in 2017 and 2018, four concerts in Oceania and 18 concerts in Europe in 2018. The tour received critical acclaim.

Background
"This is a total passion project for me", Amy Lee said. "There are so many layers in our music underneath the huge drums and guitars. I've always wanted to shine a light on some of the gorgeous David Campbell arrangements and programming elements in our songs, and that idea snowballed into completely re-doing them with full orchestra, not just strings, elaborate programming and experimentation." She deemed Synthesis a fun experience that became "something bigger because you're really starting from scratch on the songs", and found the musical journey to be therapeutic. Lee said she was excited about the new instrumental material on the album and performing with a full orchestra live for the first time in their career.

The Synthesis Live tour was announced by the band on August 14, 2017. They would be accompanied on stage by a different 28-piece orchestra in every city, performing re-worked orchestral and electronica-arrangements of some of their back catalogue plus two new songs from Synthesis. For each city on the tour, a local orchestra was assembled by the show's conductor, Susie Seiter. With the purchase of tickets for the concerts, concertgoers received a free download of the album along with an instant download of the reworked version of "Bring Me to Life" included on Synthesis. For the final leg of the North American tour, violinist Lindsey Stirling, who featured on the Synthesis song "Hi-Lo", co-headlined with Evanescence, with both artists alternating on who headlined each night.

Critical reception
The Synthesis Live concert tour received critical acclaim, with several publications calling it an ambitious tour. Billboard wrote that Evanescence "delivered a riveting performance" and Lee "delved into every nuance of her vocals" with her "haunting voice and eerie piano" evoking "the pulse of Evanescence's sound". Gig Wise said the band "exceeded all expectations" and "the multiple layers in this performance make it become a whole different jaw-dropping experience". "Each and every musician onstage is in perfect sync" and Lee emits "such incredible depth and sound", Renowned for Sound reviewed, regarding the concert "spectacular." Variety wrote, "Lee firmly re-establishes herself as one of rock's pre-eminent vocalists" while "she and the ensemble turn the familiar material into full-throttle, wide-screen epics, its themes of loss, guilt and self-doubt enlarged to tragedy on the Greek proscenium. The Wall Street Journal commended Lee's "rich, measured yet emotional performance" and piano work, concluding, "the majesty of Ms. Lee accompanied by Mr. Campbell's arrangements was undeniable."

Live album
On August 8, 2018, Eagle Rock Entertainment announced Synthesis Live on CD with DVD or Blu-ray and digital download to be released on October 12, 2018. The concert film was shot during their fall 2017 tour at Foxwoods Resort Casino Grand Theater in Connecticut and directed by P. R. Brown and mixed by Damian Taylor. The set contained the entire concert with a live orchestra and included the music video for "Hi-Lo".

Setlist
Orchestra opening
 "La Strada" (by Nino Rota)
 "La Chasse" (by Wolfgang Amadeus Mozart)
 "Pavane" (by Gabriel Fauré)
 "Moonlight Sonata" (by Ludwig van Beethoven)
 "Lacrimosa" (by Wolfgang Amadeus Mozart)
 "Sally's Song" (by Danny Elfman)

Evanescence with orchestra
 "Overture"
 "Never Go Back"
 "Lacrymosa"
 "End of the Dream"
 "My Heart Is Broken"
 "Lithium"
 "Bring Me to Life"
 "Unraveling"
 "Imaginary"
 "Secret Door"
 "Across the Universe" (The Beatles cover, played on second North American leg)
 "Hi-Lo" (with Lindsey Stirling on second North American leg)
 "Lost in Paradise"
 "Your Star"
 "My Immortal"
 "The In-Between"
 "Imperfection"

Encore
 "Speak to Me"
 "Good Enough"
 "Swimming Home" / "Weight of the World"

On the first night of the tour, at the Pearl Concert Theater, Las Vegas, October 14, "Speak to Me" was not performed. Starting November 30, "Weight of the World" was performed instead of "Swimming Home". "Palladio / No More Tears / Alive", a mashup of Ozzy Osbourne and Sia, was performed by both Evanescence and Lindsey Stirling starting July 7, 2018.

Tour dates

Changed dates
The concert in Brisbane was originally scheduled for February 11, at the Brisbane Entertainment Centre, but the promoter changed the date to February 10 and the venue to the Brisbane Convention & Exhibition Centre.

Personnel
Evanescence
 Amy Lee – vocals, piano
 Will Hunt – drums, electronic percussion
 Troy McLawhorn – guitar
 Tim McCord – guitar
 Jen Majura – guitar, theremin, backing vocals

Additional musicians
 Will Hunt –  electronics, percussion
 Dave Eggar – cello
 Susie Seiter – conductor

References

2017 concert tours
2018 concert tours
Concert tours of Australia
Concert tours of Canada
Concert tours of France
Concert tours of Germany
Concert tours of the United Kingdom
Concert tours of the United States
Evanescence concert tours